"The Isis" is an alternative name for the River Thames, used from its source in the Cotswolds until it is joined by the Thame at Dorchester in Oxfordshire. It derives from the ancient name for the Thames, Tamesis, which in the Middle Ages was believed to be a combination of "Thame" and "Isis". Notably, the Isis flows through the city of Oxford.

Rowing
The name "Isis" is especially used in the context of rowing at the University of Oxford. A number of rowing regattas are held on the Isis, including Eights Week, the most important Oxford University regatta, in the Trinity term (summer), Torpids in the Hilary term (early spring) and Christ Church Regatta for novices in the Michaelmas term (autumn). Because the width of the river is restricted at Oxford, rowing eights normally have a staggered start near Donnington Bridge and must then aim to "bump" the eight in front (i.e. catch up and touch or overlap with it sufficiently). The leading eight aims to "row over" (i.e. finish the race without being bumped).

There used to be ornate wooden barges on the river bank at the southern end of Christ Church Meadow to house rowing facilities and for viewing races. Now the barges are gone and there are boathouses instead a little further down the river near the confluence with the River Cherwell. Poplar Walk in Christ Church Meadow is used as a route to and from the boathouses.

The name "Isis" is also used for the men's second rowing eight of Oxford University Boat Club, who race against Goldie, the men's second crew of the Cambridge University Boat Club, before the annual Oxford vs. Cambridge Boat Race on the Thames in London.

Angling
The Isis, like much of the Thames, has long been popular among anglers for its freshwater fish, including trout and crayfish.  The Oxford region is home to several angling clubs.  W. F. Wallett, a popular Victorian clown, shares in his memoirs his own anecdote about fishing in the Isis with the celebrated circus proprietor Pablo Fanque:

Related uses

The keystones of Henley Bridge depict carved faces intended to represent the Isis and the Thame. Thame is a bearded man, while Isis is female.

The Morris Isis name was first used by Morris Motors Limited of Oxford on a six-cylinder car made from 1929 to 1931. It was resurrected on a six-cylinder car from the British Motor Corporation in the 1950s. The name died out in 1958.

HMP Isis is a Category C Young Offenders Institution in England operated by His Majesty's Prisons adjacent to HMP Belmarsh and HMP Thameside near the River Thames in the Woolwich area of South East London.

Each of the Formula Student cars manufactured by the Oxford Brookes racing team uses the name ISIS in the beginning of its chassis number. ISIS is then succeeded by the year number; for example, ISIS XII was the 2012 chassis, nicknamed "Miss Iggy".

The ISIS neutron source is named after the river Isis.

See also
 Bumps race
 Christ Church Meadow
 Folly Bridge
 Port Meadow
 Rowing on the River Thames

References

Geography of Oxford
Terminology of the University of Oxford
0Isis
Rivers of Oxfordshire
Rowing in Oxford
Tourist attractions in Oxford
Christ Church Meadow, Oxford
Rowing venues in the United Kingdom
Isis